BIR or Bir may refer to:

Acronyms (BIR)
Bangladesh Infantry Regiment, an infantry regiment of the Bangladesh Army
 Bataillon d'Intervention Rapide, Cameroon's armed forces elite unit
 Bilhete de Identidade de Residente, the identity card issued to residents of the Chinese SAR of Macau
 Brainerd International Raceway, a road course, drag strip and kart track in Brainerd, Minnesota, USA
 British Institute of Radiology, professional society for medical imaging 
 Birmingham International Raceway, a  oval paved racetrack located at the Alabama State Fairgrounds
 Board of Invention and Research, a military research group of the British Royal Navy Admiralty during World War I
 Burma's IOC country code
 Bureau of Internal Revenue (Philippines), an attached agency of the Department of Finance in the Philippines
 Baculovirus Inhibitor of apoptosis protein Repeat, a domain commonly found in Inhibitor of Apoptosis Proteins (IAPs)
 Built-in 'robe, a British term to describe a living space with a built-in closet
 British Indian Restaurant, adaptation of traditional Indian food for the British market
 Bir railway station's station code
 Biólogo Interno Residente, Spain

Proper Names (Bir)
 Bir, Himachal Pradesh, town in the Indian state of Himachal Pradesh
Bir, Madhya Pradesh
 Bir, Iran, a village in Fars Province, Iran
 Bir-e Bala, a village in Sistan and Baluchestan Province, Iran
 Bir-e Rasul Bakhsh, a village in Sistan and Baluchestan Province, Iran
 Bir-e Sofla, a village in Sistan and Baluchestan Province, Iran
 Bir, alternate name of Birdaf, a village in Sistan and Baluchestan Province, Iran
 Bir Ma'in, a Palestinian Arab village in the Ramle Subdistrict
 Bir Ghbalou District, a district of Bouïra Province, Algeria
 Bir Moghrein Airport, an airport serving Bir Moghrein, a city in the Tiris Zemmour region of Mauritania
 Bir Salim, a Palestinian Arab village in the Ramle Subdistrict
 Bir Tawil, a small area along the border between Egypt and Sudan which is claimed by neither country
 Bir Tibetan Colony, Tibetan refugee settlement in the town of Bir in Himachal Pradesh, India
 Bir Tungal, Hill area in Himachal Pradesh, India
 Beed, Maharashtra, India, also known as Bir
 Birecik, town on the Euphrates in Turkey, also known as Bir
 Bir (Mezarkabul album)
 Bir (Hepsi album), an album released by Hepsi in Turkey in April 2005
 Rosette Bir (1926–1992), French sculptor
 Bir (film), a 2020 Bangladeshi film

See also
 Bir Sreshtho, Bir Uttom, Bir Bikrom, and Bir Protik, Bangladeshi military awards